Coleophora exarga is a moth of the family Coleophoridae. It is found in Colombia.

References

exarga
Moths described in 1917
Moths of South America